Procopius aeneolus is a species of spider in the family Corinnidae, found in Equatorial Guinea.

References

Corinnidae
Endemic fauna of Guinea
Spiders of Africa
Spiders described in 1903